William Hocking  known as "Downderry Bill" (1929–2020) was a Cornish fisherman, being based in the port of Looe.

References

External links
 South West News Service on YouTube – Bill Hocking from Looe – UK's oldest fisherman in 2010
 Countrywise – Bill Hocking talks about his life as a fisherman in 2015

1929 births
2020 deaths
Fishers